Carbonara di Bari is a quartiere of Bari, in the region of Apulia in Italy.

Landmarks 
Carbonara contains the Bari Ceglie-Carbonara railway station, as well as the Bari War Cemetery. The cemetery contains 2,054 Commonwealth casualties of the First and Second world wars.

References 

Cities and towns in Apulia
Quarters of Bari
Former municipalities of Apulia